Boze Mill Hollow is a valley in Oregon County in the U.S. state of Missouri.

Boze Mill Hollow derives its name from Richard Boze, the early proprietor of a now-defunct watermill.

References

Valleys of Oregon County, Missouri
Valleys of Missouri